Huascacocha may refer to:

 Huascacocha (Carhuacayan), a lake in Peru
 Huascacocha (Lima), a lake in Peru